Ecole supérieure d'Informatique, réseaux et systèmes d'information (acronym ITIN) was a public higher education apprenticeship school in Cergy-Pontoise, France.

The school was created in Cergy, France, in 1988 under the signature of René Monory, French Minister of Education.
In 2005, the school opened a second campus in Pontoise, France.

Administrative status
ITIN is belonging to the Chamber of Commerce and Industry of Versailles-Val d'Oise-Yvelines.

The school is run with funds from the Regional council of Île-de-France region, from apprenticeship tax and from partner companies.

Diplomas delivered by ITIN are registered in the French National Diploma repository.
Quality control is made by the Academic service for apprenticeship control (a department of the Ministry of National Education) and by the French National Diploma Commission

Departments

 Information systems
 Telecommunications
 Computer networks
 Business of IT

International

International strategy 

ITIN has developed a training program, International Business Engineering, which is taught fully in English and in the near future intends to offer courses in English regarding the Management of Information systems. In this way foreign students can choose whether they want to study in English or in French at ITIN.
The international development of ITIN is important for the school itself, and also for the students and companies employing them. The students gain international knowledge, experiences and skills.
Students and teachers exchanges:

International partners 
 Hoa Sen University, Vietnam
 Kharkiv National University of Radioelectronics, Ukraine
 Bharatiya Vidya Bhavan Campus, Mumbai,  India
 Seinäjoki University of Applied Sciences, Finland
 Université Laval, Canada
 Babeş-Bolyai University, Cluj, Romania
 Staffordshire University, England
 University of Iaşi Romania
 Yeditepe University, Istanbul Turkey
 Tallinn University Estonia
 Bharatiya Vidya Bhavan Campus Mumbai India
 Södertörn University en Sweden

References

External links
 ITIN official website
 ITIN official website

Engineering universities and colleges in France
Buildings and structures in Val-d'Oise
Grandes écoles
Vocational education in France